For the purposes of parading, the regular army & the volunteer force of the Sri Lanka Army is listed according to an order of precedence. 

 Sri Lanka Armoured Corps 
 Sri Lanka Artillery
 Sri Lanka Engineers
 Sri Lanka Signals Corps 
 Sri Lanka Light Infantry
 Sri Lanka Sinha Regiment
 Gemunu Watch 
 Gajaba Regiment 
 Vijayabahu Infantry Regiment 
 Mechanized Infantry Regiment
 Commando Regiment
 Special Forces Regiment
 Military Intelligence Corps 
 Engineer Services Regiment 
 Sri Lanka Army Service Corps
 Sri Lanka Army Medical Corps
 Sri Lanka Army Ordnance Corps 
 Sri Lanka Electrical and Mechanical Engineers 
 Sri Lanka Corps of Military Police 
 Sri Lanka Army General Service Corps 
 Sri Lanka Army Women's Corps 
 Sri Lanka Army Corps of Agriculture and Livestock
 Sri Lanka Rifle Corps 
 Sri Lanka Army Pioneer Corps 
 Sri Lanka National Guard

Sri Lanka Army